Spring Grove Forge Mansion is a historic home located at East Earl Township, Lancaster County, Pennsylvania. The mansion is a large, two-story, "L"-shaped, stuccoed stone building.  The main block is six bays wide and features a full-width gouge carved piazza.  The kitchen wing is the oldest section and dates before 1764.

It was listed on the National Register of Historic Places in 1984.

References

Houses on the National Register of Historic Places in Pennsylvania
Houses in Lancaster County, Pennsylvania
National Register of Historic Places in Lancaster County, Pennsylvania